Disintegration or disintegrate may refer to:

Music

Albums
 Disintegrate (Zyklon album) or the title song, 2006
 Disintegration (The Cure album) or the title song, 1989
 Disintegration, by I've Sound, 2002

Songs
 "Disintegrate", by Def Leppard from Euphoria, 1999
 "Disintegrate", by Faster Pussycat from The Power and the Glory Hole, 2006
 "Disintegrate", by Gravity Kills from Perversion, 1998
 "Disintegration", by Edge of Sanity from Crimson II, 2003
 "Disintegration", by Henry Rollins from Nights Behind the Tree Line, 2004
 "Disintegration", by Jimmy Eat World from Stay on My Side Tonight, 2005
 "Disintegration", by Monarchy featuring Dita Von Teese, 2013
 "Disintegration", by Theatre of Tragedy from Storm, 2006
 "Disintegrator", by DJ Swamp, 1998

Science and mathematics 
 Disintegration theorem, a mathematical result in measure theory and probability theory
 Nuclear disintegration, or nuclear decay, the result of radioactive decay

Other 
 Disintegration (video game), a 2020 first-person shooter
 Disintegration ray, or raygun, a fictitious weapon
 Disintegration, a 1990 film; see List of the 100 best films in the history of Ukrainian cinema
 Disintegration, a 2018 short film directed by Buğra Mert Alkayalar

See also
 Ablation
 Collapse (disambiguation)
 Decay chain, in nuclear science
 Derivative, in mathematics
 Integration (disambiguation)